Universal CityWalk is the name shared by the entertainment and retail districts located adjacent to the theme parks of Universal Destinations & Experiences. CityWalk began as an expansion of Universal's first park, Universal Studios Hollywood, and serves as an entrance plaza from the parking lots to the theme parks. CityWalk can also be found at Universal Orlando Resort in Florida, Universal Studios Japan in Osaka, Japan, and Universal Beijing Resort in Beijing, China.

CityWalk Hollywood and CityWalk Orlando have some common tenants, but their respective architectural styles are quite different. Where CityWalk Hollywood incorporates a classic modern blend of Hollywood, CityWalk Orlando is almost entirely modern in appearance.

Universal CityWalk Hollywood 

CityWalk is separate from Universal Studios Hollywood although it does serve as an entrance from the parking lot to Universal Studios. Inspiration came from the Horton Plaza according to Jon Jerde, the architecture of CityWalk Hollywood tries to capture the architecture found all over Los Angeles.
Universal CityWalk Hollywood is a three-block entertainment, dining, shopping promenade. It has more than 30 eateries, a 19-screen movie theater featuring IMAX, 7 night spots, indoor skydiving and more than 30 stores.

History 
Designed by Jon Jerde, CityWalk opened in May 1993 adjacent to the Cineplex Odeon cinema (operated by AMC Theatres since 2006). A $1 billion,  expansion opened in 2000. Planning done by Jerde Associates. Street performers (magicians and musicians) are a common sight.

CityWalk's central plaza is topped by a 170-foot radial trellis designed and built by Pearce Structures (who also constructed Biosphere 2). The courtyard features a leaping fountain, created by WET. A huge television monitor brought in by Panasonic, is located above the multiplex, showing upcoming Universal movie releases, music videos, and NBCUniversal promotions stands next to the giant guitar towering over the Hard Rock Cafe.

In January 2010, the music video for Justin Bieber's song "Baby" was recorded here.

5 Towers 
"5 Towers" is an interactive outdoor concert venue on Universal CityWalk, featuring a technologically advanced staging system. The stage is equipped with thousands of LED fixtures, motion capture sensors, five soaring 42-foot light tower sculptures, a massive video monitor, and a state-of-the-art audio system.

The new staging system serves as the structural artistic centerpiece for CityWalk. It features live music.

Dining

Shopping

Entertainment

Universal CityWalk Orlando 

The Universal CityWalk in Orlando opened in February 1999 as one component of the expansion that transformed Universal Studios Florida into Universal Orlando Resort. It was built over the former Universal Studios parking lot and entrance. Guests arriving at the resort park in one of two-story parking garages then travel via covered moving walkways over Universal Boulevard into CityWalk. From there, guests can proceed into either two of the theme parks: Universal Studios Florida and Universal's Islands of Adventure.

Dining 
 Hard Rock Cafe Orlando – This is the second Hard Rock Café built on Universal property. The first café was built near the Psycho house, Bates Motel, E.T. Adventure, and Fievel's Playland. Although the first café was considered to be one of the largest in the chain, the company closed down the restaurant to reopen in an even bigger facility and alongside Hard Rock Live in the CityWalk section. The old Hard Rock Café building was demolished in October 2011.
 Jimmy Buffett's Margaritaville
 Lone Palm Airport – A quick service bar across from Margaritaville
 Antojito's Authentic Mexican Food  (formerly Latin Quarter in 1999)
 Starbucks
 Bubba Gump Shrimp Company – Inspired by the 1994 film Forrest Gump (formerly Motown Cafe in 1999)
 Cinnabon

 Pat O'Brien's Bar – A franchise of the original bar/restaurant in New Orleans.
 BK Whopper Bar – Limited service to the fast food restaurant Burger King
 Panda Express
 Moe's Southwest Grill
 Bob Marley – A Tribute to Freedom
 Fat Tuesday – A walk up bar
 Red Oven Pizza Bakery
 Cold Stone Creamery
 Menchie's Frozen Yogurt
 Vivo Italian Kitchen (formerly Pastamore Italian Restaurant in 1999)
 Hot Dog Hall of Fame
 Bread Box Handcrafted Sandwiches
 The Cowfish Sushi and Burger Bar
 NBC Sports Grill & Brew  (formerly NASCAR Café in 1999)
 The Toothsome Chocolate Emporium & Savory Feast Kitchen (formerly NBA City in 1999)
 Voodoo Doughnut
 Bigfire American Fare (formerly Emeril's Restaurant Orlando in 1999)
 Bend the Bao

Entertainment 
 Universal Cinemark at CityWalk, previously operated by Loews Theatres until January 26, 2006, when AMC Theatres merged the Loews Theatres chain, and previously operated by AMC until 2018.
 Bob Marley – A Tribute to Freedom
 CityWalk's Rising Star – A karaoke club featuring a live band and backup Singers. Opened in April of 2008 replacing CityJazz.
 Hard Rock Live – A separate performance venue adjacent to the Hard Rock Cafe
 Red Coconut Club (Formerly Decades Cafe in 2005)
 Jimmy Buffett's Margaritaville – Live bands take to the restaurant's stage to perform every evening.
 Hollywood Drive-In Mini Golf – A miniature golf course harkening back to 1950s era drive-in movies. The facility has two different and intricately themed courses: "The Haunting of Ghostly Greens" and "Invaders from Planet Putt-Putt". Opened in March 2012.
 Universal's Great Movie Escape – An Escape room experience with rooms themed to both Back to the Future and Jurassic World.

Shopping 
 Candy Smith (at Toothsome Chocolate Emporium)
 CityWalk Hub Store
 Hart & Huntington Tattoo Company
 Quiet Flight Surf Shop
 The Smuggler's Hold (at Jimmy Buffet's Margaritaville)
 Universal Legacy Store
 Universal Studios Store

Former Outlets 
 Big Kahuna Pizza
 BMG Gear
 Blue Man Group Theatre
 Cartooniversal
 Cigarz at Citywalk
 Element Skateboards
 The Endangered Species Store
 Fresh Produce
 Fossil, Inc.
 Fusion Bistro Sushi & Sake Bar
 Galaxy Bar
 The Groove
 Island Clothing Co.
 Katie's Candy Company
 P!Q
 TCBY
 Tommy Bahama

Incident 
On April 22, 2011, a 33-year-old man from Winter Haven, Florida, was found unconscious in front of the Universal Cineplex 20 theater after being tased by an off-duty police officer due to disorderly conduct. The man was taken to Dr. P. Phillips Hospital and later died.

Universal CityWalk Osaka 

The Universal CityWalk Osaka opened to public on March 31, 2001 as part of the Universal Studios Japan.

Dining 
 Red Lobster
 Nolboo
 Ganko
 Shinobuan
 Inaba Wako
 Shabu Sai
 Yakiniku Karubin Champ
 Fugetsu USA
 Gottie's Beef
 Pommenoki
 Fujin Raijin RA-MEN
 Kamakura Pasta
 Kobe Motomachi Doria
 Moana Kitchen
 Bubba Gump Shrimp Co.
 Hard Rock Cafe
 Kushiro Monogatari
 Bistro 309
 T.G.I. Friday's
 Aen Table
 Kyoto Katsugyu
 Daikisuisan Kaitensushi
 Mos Burger
 Funfun
 Popcorn Papa
 Moomin Stand
 Momi & Toy's
 551 Horai
 Pizza Napoletano
 Kineya Mugimaru
 Romaken
 St-Marc Cafe

Shopping 
 Edion
 Nostalgia Museum
 Rock Shop
 Little Osaka
 LAWSON - convenience store chain
 Matsumoto Kiyoshi - drug store chain
 Jump Shop - Weekly Shōnen Jump official shop with character goods
 Claire's
 Maimo
 Gap Factory Store
 Boushiya Flava

Other 

 Takoyaki museum (Takoyaki Dining)
 The Original Takoyaki Tamade, Osaka Aiduya
 Takoya Dotonbori Kukuru
 Osaka Amerikamura Kougaryu
 Abeno Takoyaki Yamachan
 Juhachiban
 Naniwa's Specialty Ichibirian

Universal CityWalk Beijing 

The Universal CityWalk Beijing opened to public on September 2, 2021 as part of the Universal Beijing Resort's first phase with no entrance fee.

Dining 

 BMW JOYCUBE
 Bubba Gump Shrimp Company
 CityWalk Red Oven Pizza Bakery
 CityWalk WUBEI CRAFT FOOD AND BEER
 Cutie Cones
 Donglaishun
 Jumbo Seafood
 KPRO
 Neon Street Hawkers
 Peet's Coffee
 Phoenix House Superior Shop
 Quanjude
 The Cowfish Sushi Burger Bar
 TIME TRAVEL GRANDMA'S HOME FLAGSHIP STORE
 Universal CityWalk - The Toothsome Chocolate Emporium & Savory Feast Kitchen

Shopping 

 Adidas
 Harmay
 Kakao Friends
 POP MART
 Swarovski
 Universal CityWalk - The Toothsome Chocolate Emporium Candy Store
 Universal Studios Store

Entertainment 
 Universal CityWalk Cinema

References

External links 
 
 Universal CityWalk Hollywood official Web site
 CityWalk Orlando official Web site
 Universal CityWalk Restaurants
 
 

Universal City, California
Tourist attractions in Los Angeles County, California
San Fernando Valley
Shopping malls in the San Fernando Valley
American companies established in 1993
Retail companies established in 1993
Pedestrian malls in the United States
Buildings and structures in Orlando, Florida
Tourist attractions in Orlando, Florida
Shopping malls in Florida
Shopping malls established in 1993
Shopping malls established in 1999
Shopping malls established in 2000
Shopping malls established in 2001
1999 establishments in California